Cedric De Troetsel (born 8 July 1988) is a Belgian retired football defender.

Career
Before his time with K Rupel Boom FC, Cedric De Troetsel played for SK Lierse.

After a spell with Belgian First Division club FC Brussels, Cedric joined K. Rupel Boom FC in 2008.

Amongst the fans, De Troetsel is affectionately known as "Jeromeke", because of his relentless defending and never giving up.

International career
De Troetsel was part of the national -16 and -21 teams.

References

External links
 
 

1988 births
Living people
Belgian footballers
Lierse S.K. players
R.S.C. Anderlecht players
K. Rupel Boom F.C. players
R.W.D.M. Brussels F.C. players
Association football defenders